The Egg Collector is a 1940 Warner Bros. Merrie Melodies directed by Chuck Jones. The short was released on July 20, 1940, and stars Sniffles.

Plot 
Late one night in a bookstore, Sniffles the mouse is reading the book Egg Collecting For Amateurs.  According to the book, a good specimen for beginners is the egg of a great barn owl, a fictional species (previously seen in Little Brother Rat), which seemingly combines aspects of the American barn owl with the Great Horned Owl.  (Sniffles apparently does not remember his earlier attempt to get an egg from this same intimidating owl in Little Brother Rat.)

Sniffles' friend, a bookworm, takes him to the top of an old church tower where they find an owl egg.  Sniffles snatches the egg from its cradle, but the father owl stops them before they can escape.  Sniffles learns from the owl that he is a rodent and that owls eat rodents.  And worms.  The bookworm faints and Sniffles flees madly, taking the worm with him.

Home media
 VHS: Bugs Bunny and Friends 1989 (1995 Turner Dubbed Version) 
 The NTSC Dubbed Version replaces original music 1938-1941 ending music theme. With 1941-1955 and In turn the European 1995; Dubbed Version keeps 1938-1941 ending music theme. Same As Mighty Hunters
 DVD, Blu-ray: Looney Tunes Mouse Chronicles: The Chuck Jones Collection (2012)

References

External links 
The Egg Collector at the Internet Movie Database

1940 films
1940 animated films
Merrie Melodies short films
Films about mice and rats
Films about worms
Films about owls
Short films directed by Chuck Jones
Films scored by Carl Stalling
Warner Bros. Cartoons animated short films
1940s Warner Bros. animated short films